Pulsar is a maze shooter video game created by Sega/Gremlin and released in arcades in 1981. The player controls a tank in a top-down view maze to fetch keys used to unlock the next level. It was designed and programmed by Larry Clague and Mike Hendricks.

Gameplay
Player must move the tank through the maze to reach each colored key and transport them one by one to the matching colored lock. The color of the tank changes according to the color of the transported key. The structure of the maze is changing every second and there are several kind of enemies that move on they own unique way shooting to the play when they are in a direct line (horizontal or vertical). Tank fuel is limited, but can be replenished by destroying enemies.

Level is completed when all the locks are unlocked.

References

1981 video games
Arcade video games
Arcade-only video games
Maze games
Sega arcade games
Gremlin Industries games
Video games developed in the United States